Martina Navratilova and Iván Molina defeated Rosie Reyes Darmon and Marcello Lara in the final, 6–3, 6–3 to win the mixed doubles tennis title at the 1974 French Open. It was the first major for both Molina and Navratilova. For Navratilova, it was the first of an eventual ten mixed doubles major titles, and the first of an eventual Open Era record 59 major titles overall.

Françoise Dürr and Jean-Claude Barclay were the defending champions, but Dürr did not compete this year. Barclay partnered Julie Heldman, but lost in the quarterfinals to Rosie Reyes Darmon and Marcello Lara.

Seeds
No seeds were given for this tournament.

Draw

Finals

Top half

Bottom half

References

External links
 Official Results Archive (WTA)
1974 French Open – Doubles draws and results at the International Tennis Federation

Mixed Doubles
French Open by year – Mixed doubles
French Open - Mixed Doubles
1974 in women's tennis
1974 in French women's sport